Red Hot is RuPaul's fourth  official album release. Red Hot consists of a mixture of house, pop, club/dance and R&B songs. It includes the three Top 10 Hot Dance Music/Club Play chart hits, "Looking Good, Feeling Gorgeous", "Workout" and "People Are People". Highlights include, "Are You Man Enough", "Hollywood USA", "Freaky/Kinky" and "Just a Little In & Out". It is RuPaul's first album released under his own independent record label RuCo, Inc.

Track listing

(co.) signifies a co-producer.

Chart positions

References

2004 albums
RuPaul albums